Route 148 is a state highway in southern and southeastern Connecticut running from Route 79 in Killingworth (near the Durham line) to Route 82 in the village of Hadlyme (in the town of Lyme). Route 148 crosses the Connecticut River using the Chester–Hadlyme Ferry.

Route description
It then turns east along Tooley Road then Chester Road as it heads towards the town of Chester. On entering Chester, the road becomes West Main Street, continuing eastward toward the town center. Along the way it has a junction with Route 145 (signed for the village of Winthrop) and with Route 9 (at Exit 6)before turning east northeast. In Chester Center, the road becomes Water Street, which continues to an intersection with Route 154 (for Deep River and Haddam). After crossing Route 154, the road becomes Ferry Road as it runs for another  to the Chester-Hadlyme Ferry landing on the west bank of the Connecticut River. After crossing the river into the town of Lyme, Route 148 (still known as Ferry Road) continues east through the village of Hadlyme for another  until it ends at an intersection with Route 82.

History

The Killingworth to Chester route was chartered as a turnpike in 1816 known as the Chester and North Killingworth Turnpike and ran along Chester Road and West Main Street. In 1834, an eastward extension towards the Chester-Hadlyme Ferry (then privately owned and known as Warner's Ferry) by the same turnpike company was authorized. In the same year, another company, the Hadlyme Turnpike, was chartered to build a turnpike from the Lyme side of the ferry towards the town of Salem. In 1835, still another turnpike company, the Madison and North Killingworth Turnpike, was chartered to build a road from the end of the Chester and North Killingworth Turnpike to the village of North Madison, using Tooley Road, then Abner Lane, and now abandoned roads across Lake Hammonasset. This series of turnpikes was envisioned by its proponents as part of an all-turnpike route between New Haven and Norwich. The business proved unprofitable, however, and between the years of 1842 and 1847, the various turnpike companies along the Route 148 alignment were dissolved and the roads turned over to the towns.

Modern Route 148 was established as part of the 1932 state highway renumbering and originally ran from Route 81 in Killingworth to the Hadlyme railroad station in Lyme. In 1951, the eastern terminus was moved to the Chester ferry landing. In 1962, it was extended westward to Route 79 along its current alignment, and also eastward from the Hadlyme ferry landing to Route 82 (along former SR 618).

Junction list

References

External links

148
Transportation in Middlesex County, Connecticut
Transportation in New London County, Connecticut